The First National Assembly of Epidaurus (1821–1822) was the first meeting of the Greek National Assembly, a national representative political gathering of the Greek revolutionaries.

History

The assembly opened in December 1821 at Piada (today Nea (New) Epidaurus). It was attended by representatives from regions involved in the revolution against Ottoman rule.

The majority of the representatives were local notables and clergymen from the Peloponnese, Central Greece and the islands. In addition, a number of Phanariotes and academics attended. However, a number of prominent revolutionaries, including Alexander Ypsilantis and the most prominent military leaders were absent. Of the 59 representatives at the assembly, 20 were landowners, 13 were ship-owners, 12 were intellectuals, 4 were military leaders, 3 were archpriests, 3 were merchants.

The first document adopted by the assembly proclaimed the independence of the Greek nation from the Ottoman Empire. The first paragraph was:

" In the name of the Holy and Indivisible Trinity. 
The Greek nation, wearied by the dreadful weight of Ottoman oppression, and resolved to break its yoke, though at the price of the greatest sacrifice, proclaims today before God and man, by the organ of its lawful representatives, met in national assembly, its independence."

It also passed a number of other important documents, including:
 The Provisional Regime of Greece (Προσωρινό Πολίτευμα της Ελλάδος), sometimes translated as Temporary Constitution of Greece (more commonly known as the Greek Constitution of 1822), which also included a Declaration of Independence.

The Assembly elected a five-member executive on 15 January 1822, which was presided over by Alexandros Mavrocordatos. The executive in turn appointed the first government which had 8 ministries.

The first legislature had 33 members.

Another characteristic of the First National Assembly is the absence of any reference in the Constitution to the Filiki Eteria, although Dimitrios Ypsilantis, brother of Alexandros Ypsilantis and official representative of the Filiki Eteria, was appointed president of the legislature, a body controlled by the local notables.

List of delegates

See also
Executive of 1822

References

Citations

Books
 
 

1821 in Greece
1822 in Greece
1st
History of Argolis
Peloponnese in the Greek War of Independence